The 2017 All-Ireland Minor Hurling Championship was the 87th staging of the All-Ireland hurling championship since its establishment by the Gaelic Athletic Association in 1928. It is the primary inter-county hurling championship for boys under the age of eighteen. The championship began on 5 April 2017 and ended on 3 September 2017.

Tipperary entered the championship as the defending champions, however, they were defeated by Cork in a Munster semi-final replay.

On 3 September 2017 Galway won the championship following a 2-17 to 2-15 defeat of Cork in the All-Ireland final. This was their 11th All-Ireland title and their first in two championship seasons.

Participating teams

Provincial Champsionships

Leinster Minor Hurling Championship

First round

Second round

Quarter-finals

Semi-finals

Final

Munster Minor Hurling Championship

Quarter-finals

				

Play-offs

Semi-finals

Final

Ulster Minor Hurling Championship

Quarter-final

Semi-finals

Final

All-Ireland Minor Hurling Championship

Quarter-finals

Semi-finals

Final

Championship statistics

Top scorers

Top scorers overall

Top scorers in a single game

References

Minor
All-Ireland Minor Hurling Championship